Amélie Mauresmo was the defending champion, but did not compete this year.

Dája Bedáňová won the title by defeating Miriam Oremans 6–1, 5–7, 6–3 in the final.

Seeds

Draw

Finals

Top half

Bottom half

References

External links
 Official results archive (ITF)
 Official results archive (WTA)

WTA Bratislava
2000 in Slovak sport